The Phantom of the Moulin Rouge (French: Le fantôme du Moulin-Rouge) is a 1925 French silent comedy fantasy film (made in 1924), directed by René Clair and starring Albert Préjean, Sandra Milovanoff and Paul Ollivier. It was based on a novel by Walter Schlee. The film's sets were designed by Robert Gys.

Plot
Julien Boissel is engaged to marry Yvonne, but her diplomat father is against it. Her father is being blackmailed by a corrupt newspaper publisher named Gauthier, who states he will surrender the incriminating evidence he has if the old man will allow him to marry Yvonne. To save her father from a scandal, Yvonne agrees to marry the blackmailer.

A depressed Julien encounters a mesmerist named Dr. Window at the famed Moulin-Rouge nightclub, and he allows the doctor to experiment on him with his mesmeric powers. Julien's spirit is freed from his corporeal body and he goes on a mischievous spree around Paris, causing a string of humorous and frightening occurrences. The police come across Julien's body while he is out of it and believe he is dead, and Dr. Window is charged with the murder.

Julien discovers an autopsy is scheduled to be performed on his "corpse", and if this happens, his spirit will never be able to reenter it. Julien manages to get the incriminating evidence away from Gauthier and deliver it to Yvonne, then returns to his body just moments before the time of the proposed autopsy. Dr. Window is exonerated when Julien's corpse returns to life, and Julien gets the girl.

Cast
 Georges Vaultier as Julien Boissel, the Phantom 
 Sandra Milovanoff as Yvonne Vincent  
 Maurice Schutz as Victor Vincent, Yvonne's father 
 Paul Ollivier as Dr. Window 
 José Davert as Gauthier, the publisher/ blackmailer
 Madeleine Rodrigue as Jacqueline 
 Albert Préjean as Jean Degland, reporter

References

Bibliography
 Celia McGerr. René Clair. Twayne Publishers, 1980.

External links

1925 films
Films directed by René Clair
French silent feature films
French fantasy films
1920s fantasy films
Films set in Paris
French black-and-white films
1920s French films